Choveys-e Do (also known as Joveyz-e Do and Joveyzeh Do) is a village in Shoaybiyeh-ye Gharbi Rural District, Shadravan District, Shushtar County, Khuzestan Province, Iran. At the 2006 census, its population was 394, in 67 families.

References 

Populated places in Shushtar County